Rick Olarenshaw (born 1 February 1973) is a former Australian rules footballer in the Australian Football League.

He was formerly a boundary rider for Network Seven until being replaced by Matthew Richardson.

Playing career

Essendon
Olarenshaw was recruited from Keilor in 1990 to the Essendon Football Club, where he won the under-19s best and fairest in 1991. He made his senior AFL debut in 1993 with the Bombers and enjoyed a quick rise that year. The left-foot wingman was an important player in the 1993 Bombers premiership side (known as the "Baby Bombers").

Over the following seasons he suffered numerous injuries, particularly to his rib and back, but he went on to enjoy a good season in 1997.

Later career/trades
Olarenshaw was traded to Collingwood (instead of his preferred club, the Kangaroos) at the end of 1998 after agreeing to leave Essendon. Olarenshaw was disillusioned by the new surroundings at Collingwood and suffered injuries that restricted him to just five games with the club.
 At the end of 2000, he was traded to the Kangaroos, but he managed only one game before announcing his retirement in 2001.

Statistics

|-
|- style="background-color: #EAEAEA"
|style="text-align:center;background:#afe6ba;"|1993†
|style="text-align:center;"|
| 47 || 16 || 5 || 5 || 207 || 118 || 325 || 75 || 21 || 0.3 || 0.3 || 12.9 || 7.4 || 20.3 || 4.7 || 1.3 || 0
|-
! scope="row" style="text-align:center" | 1994
|style="text-align:center;"|
| 47 || 10 || 1 || 1 || 70 || 58 || 128 || 25 || 12 || 0.1 || 0.1 || 7.0 || 5.8 || 12.8 || 2.5 || 1.2 || 3
|- style="background-color: #EAEAEA"
! scope="row" style="text-align:center" | 1995
|style="text-align:center;"|
| 47 || 11 || 3 || 2 || 112 || 72 || 184 || 42 || 4 || 0.3 || 0.2 || 10.2 || 6.5 || 16.7 || 3.8 || 0.4 || 2
|-
! scope="row" style="text-align:center" | 1996
|style="text-align:center;"|
| 47 || 8 || 1 || 0 || 96 || 76 || 172 || 46 || 7 || 0.1 || 0.0 || 12.0 || 9.5 || 21.5 || 5.8 || 0.9 || 1
|- style="background-color: #EAEAEA"
! scope="row" style="text-align:center" | 1997
|style="text-align:center;"|
| 47 || 15 || 2 || 2 || 141 || 117 || 258 || 52 || 23 || 0.1 || 0.1 || 9.4 || 7.8 || 17.2 || 3.5 || 1.5 || 0
|-
! scope="row" style="text-align:center" | 1998
|style="text-align:center;"|
| 47 || 17 || 2 || 5 || 140 || 122 || 262 || 50 || 23 || 0.1 || 0.3 || 8.2 || 7.2 || 15.4 || 2.9 || 1.4 || 0
|- style="background-color: #EAEAEA"
! scope="row" style="text-align:center" | 1999
|style="text-align:center;"|
| 8 || 5 || 0 || 1 || 28 || 29 || 57 || 13 || 10 || 0.0 || 0.2 || 5.6 || 5.8 || 11.4 || 2.6 || 2.0 || 0
|-
! scope="row" style="text-align:center" | 2000
|style="text-align:center;"|
| 8 || 0 || — || — || — || — || — || — || — || — || — || — || — || — || — || — || —
|- style="background-color: #EAEAEA"
! scope="row" style="text-align:center" | 2001
|style="text-align:center;"|
| 47 || 1 || 0 || 0 || 2 || 2 || 4 || 1 || 0 || 0.0 || 0.0 || 2.0 || 2.0 || 4.0 || 1.0 || 0.0 || 0
|- class="sortbottom"
! colspan=3| Career
! 83
! 14
! 16
! 796
! 594
! 1390
! 304
! 100
! 0.2
! 0.2
! 9.6
! 7.2
! 16.7
! 3.7
! 1.2
! 6
|}

Post-playing career
Following the 2009 AFL season, he was removed as Channel 7's boundary rider in favour of Matthew Richardson.

References

External links

1973 births
Living people
Australian television presenters
Collingwood Football Club players
Essendon Football Club players
Essendon Football Club Premiership players
North Melbourne Football Club players
Keilor Football Club players
Australian rules footballers from Melbourne
Australian physiotherapists
Australian sports agents
People educated at Penleigh and Essendon Grammar School
One-time VFL/AFL Premiership players
People from Keilor, Victoria